The Leichter Kampfwagen or "LK I" was a German light tank prototype of the First World War. Designed to be a cheap light tank as opposed to the expensive heavies coming into service at the time, the tank only reached the prototype stage before the end of the war.

History
The LK I was designed by Joseph Vollmer. It was based on a Daimler car chassis, using the existing axles to mount sprocket and idler wheels. Its design followed automobile practice, with a front-mounted engine and a driving compartment behind it. It was the first German armored fighting vehicle to be equipped with a turret, armed with a 7.92 mm MG08 machine gun.

Only two prototypes were produced in mid 1918, but no vehicles were ordered. Designed as an experimental cavalry tank, it to paved the way to the LK II.

Notes

External links
Achtung Panzer! First Panzers 1917-1918

Light tanks of Germany
World War I tanks of Germany
World War I light tanks
Trial and research tanks of Germany
History of the tank